Carl Theodore Bergstrom is a theoretical and evolutionary biologist and a professor at the University of Washington in Seattle, Washington. Bergstrom is a critic of low-quality or misleading scientific research. He is the co-author of a book on misinformation called Calling Bullshit: The Art of Skepticism in a Data-Driven World and teaches a class by the same name at University of Washington.

Education
Bergstrom completed his Ph.D. at Stanford University under the supervision of Marcus Feldman in 1998.

Research 
Bergstrom's work concerns the flow of information through biological and social networks, as well as the ecology and evolution of pathogenic organisms, including the development of resistance.

He is the coauthor (with Lee Dugatkin) of a college textbook, Evolution. With Jevin West, he developed the popular course and website Calling Bullshit. His work has led to the identification of him as a resource to explain the dynamics of disinformation and misinformation, in general.

In addition to evolutionary biology, Bergstrom's interests include the ranking of scientific journals. In 2007, he introduced the Eigenfactor, metrics for journal ranking. This and related work on open access earned him and his father, Ted Bergstrom, the SPARC Innovator Award in June 2007.

See also

 Brandolini's law
 On Bullshit

References

External links

 Carl Bergstrom page at Santa Fe
 

Evolutionary biologists
Theoretical biologists
University of Washington faculty
Living people
Santa Fe Institute people
21st-century American biologists
Stanford University alumni
Harvard College alumni
Year of birth missing (living people)